The St. Paul Union Pacific Vertical-lift Rail Bridge is a vertical-lift bridge that spans the Mississippi River in downtown St. Paul, Minnesota, United States. It is one of only three vertical-lift bridges along the Mississippi River, along with the Hastings Rail Bridge in Hastings, Minnesota, and the Wabash Bridge in Hannibal, Missouri. It was designed by Waddell & Harrington and built in 1913. The vertical-lift span has  towers, and the electrical lift system was built with a possible  elevation. However, by 1973, the amount of lift was reduced to  because of aging of the equipment.

The bridge was originally built by the Chicago Great Western Railroad, which later became part of the Chicago and North Western Transportation Company.  The Robert Street Bridge, built later in 1926, had to be carefully engineered around the railroad bridge.

In April 1997, high water on the Mississippi River reached the bottom of the span. The Union Pacific Railroad spotted a train of hopper cars laden with rocks on the bridge to help anchor it and keep it from being washed away.

In 2021, Union Pacific proposed demolishing the bridge and building a replacement with a drawbridge design.

See also
List of crossings of the Upper Mississippi River

References

 

1913 establishments in Minnesota
Bridges completed in 1913
Union Pacific Vertical Lift Rail
Bridges over the Mississippi River
Chicago Great Western Railway
Railroad bridges in Minnesota
Union Pacific Railroad bridges
Vertical lift bridges in Minnesota